Greg Ellena (born in Gibsonia, Pennsylvania) was a designated hitter who is most notable for winning the 1985 College World Series Most Outstanding Player award while a junior at University of Miami. He is one of four players from University of Miami to win that award. The others are Dan Smith, Pat Burrell and Charlton Jimerson.

He never played professionally. He did however bat 1.000 in exhibition games against major league teams while in college.

Ellena graduated with a degree in electrical engineering. He worked for Florida Power and Light and Dominion Power.

References
Article on Ellena

 University of Miami College of Engineering alumni
Living people
College World Series Most Outstanding Player Award winners
Year of birth missing (living people)